Eugenia uniflora, the pitanga, Suriname cherry, Brazilian cherry, Cayenne cherry, cerisier carré, monkimonki kersie or ñangapirí, is a flowering plant in the family Myrtaceae, native to tropical South America’s east coast, ranging from Suriname, French Guiana to southern Brazil, as well as Uruguay and parts of Paraguay and Argentina.
It is often used in gardens as a hedge or screen. The tree was introduced to Bermuda for ornamental purposes but is now out of control and listed as an invasive species.
The tree has also been introduced to Florida.

Description
When bruised, crushed, or cut, the leaves and branches have a spicy resinous fragrance, which can cause respiratory discomfort in susceptible individuals. The leaves are without stipules, ovate, glossy, and held in opposite pairs. During winter, the leaves turn red.

Flowers have four white petals and are borne on long slender stalks, with a conspicuous central cluster of white stamens ending in yellow anthers. Because fruit-eating birds distribute the seeds, they can become a weed in suitable tropical and sub-tropical habitats, displacing native flora.

Uses

Culinary uses
The edible fruit is a botanical berry. The taste ranges from sweet to sour, depending on the cultivar and level of ripeness (the darker red to black range is quite sweet, while the green to orange range is strikingly tart). Its predominant food use is as a flavoring and base for jams and jellies. The fruit is high in vitamin C and a source of provitamin A.

The leaves are also used for tea in certain parts of Uruguay.

Use as an insect repellent
The leaves are spread on some house floors in Brazil so that they exude a smell that repels flies when crushed underfoot.

Medical uses
Eugenia uniflora has several significant pharmacological properties. Its essential oil is antihypertensive, antidiabetic, antitumor and analgesic, and it has shown antiviral and antifungal activity. It has performed against microorganisms such as Trichomonas gallinae (in vitro), Trypanosoma cruzi and Leishmania amazonensis.

It also shows significant anti-inflammatory properties, and is used extensively as a folk remedy in South America against stomach diseases.

Gallery

References

External links

Purdue University New Crop Resource Online Program
Eugenia uniflora in the Global Invasive Species Database 
Eugenia uniflora information from the Pacific Island Ecosystems at Risk project (PIER)
Weed risk assessment for Eugenia uniflora for Hawaii/Pacific Retrieved 2010-06-20.
Bermuda Department of Conservation Services, Invasive Species Page for Suriname Cherry.

uniflora
Flora of South America
Plants described in 1753
Taxa named by Carl Linnaeus